Iman al-Qahtani  is a Saudi journalist and activist.

September 2013 trial 
Al-Qahtani was present at the historic September 2013 trial of Saudi dissidents Mohammad Fahad al-Qahtani and Abdullah al-Hamid in Riyadh, and used her Twitter account to post an ongoing account of the trial. Trials in Saudi Arabia are frequently held in private, so gaining access to the courtroom was "a matter of luck", she said. The court was unprepared for the number of people who showed up. Those who had gained access to the courtroom tweeted the progress of the trial, while many more monitored the trial online. Al-Qahtani remarked especially on the huge interaction with Twitter.

Education 
Al-Qatani is a graduate of the college of art in Riyadh, where she received a BA in English literature and science in 2002. She has worked for several newspapers as a journalist.

Detention and travel ban 
In July 2013, she was stopped at the airport on her way to Istanbul, and tweeted that she was subject to a travel ban.

References

External links

By al-Qatani 
 Syrian National Salvation Front`s Al-Abbasi on Islamist State, Sunni Majority, Interview with Syrian National Salvation Front Member Muhammad Id al-Abbasi, by Iman al-Qahtani, Al-Hayah Online, Thursday, April 19, 2012. 
 Saudi religious police to monitor own activities, by Iman al-Qahtani, al-Arabiya News, (Tr. Sonia Farid), Wednesday, November 12, 2008.
 Saudi poet busted for "sorcery" poems, Iman al-Qahtani, al-Arabiya News,(Tr. Sonia Farid), Sunday, November 9, 2008. 
 No divorce for 8 yr. old Saudi girl, says judge, by Iman al-Qahtani, al-Arabiya News, (Tr. Sonia Farid), Sunday, April 12, 2009. 
 Saudi religious police acquitted of homicide, by Iman al-Qahtani, al-Arabiya News, (Tr. Sonia Farid), Tuesday, September 16, 2008.
 Blogger behind bars: The Saudi authorities are holding blogger Fouad Farhan in detention - but without giving any reason for his arrest, Iman al-Qahtani, The Guardian, Saturday December 29, 2007.	
 I don't believe it: There is no basis for executing an apostate in Islam. It is nothing more than an invention by narrow-minded men, Iman al-Qahtani, The Guardian, Thursday 15 June 2006.
 On Twitter (broken link)

About al-Qahtani 
Trial of Saudi Civil Rights Activists Mohammad al-Qahtani and Abdullah al-Hamid, by Nora Abdulkarim, Jadaliyya, Sep 03 2012. (ACPRA trial)
 Political Islam Online: Saudi woman speaks out on Fanaticism (in English), Thursday, 23 January 1429 - January 31, 2008 AD (in Arabic)
 Never Talk Back To A Saudi Judge by Jess Hill, The Global Mail, September 26, 2012. (ACPRA trial)

Saudi Arabian journalists
Living people
Year of birth missing (living people)